The Munni Range is a range of mountains in far North-eastern Russia. Administratively the range is part of the Sakha Republic, Russian Federation.

Geography 
The Munni Range is one of the subranges of the Verkhoyansk Range system and is located in its southwestern section. It stretches roughly from northwest to southeast between the Kelter Range to the north and the Sorkin Range to the southwest, running in a roughly parallel direction to both ranges. The western end is bound by the valleys of the Munni (a tributary of the Belyanka) and the Buruolakh (a tributary of the (Lyapiske), beyond which rise the Muosuchan and the Bygyn Range stretching northwestwards.

River Tumara cuts across the range roughly in its central part and Segyan-Kyuyol village lies on its right bank, below the southern slopes of the mountainside. The Sordogin Range stretches eastwards beyond the valley of river Kele, at the eastern end of the range.

See also
List of mountains and hills of Russia

References

External links
Pictures of the area of the Munni Range
Fishing in Russia
Verkhoyansk Range

ceb:Munniyskiy Khrebet
sah:Мунньи